"Beautiful" is Mai Kuraki's thirty-second single, released on June 10, 2009. The single comes in two formats: limited CD+DVD edition and regular edition. It sold 29,446 copies in its first week and peaked at #2.

Content
The title song, "Beautiful", is being used in Kose Cosmeport's "Salon Style" commercials since early June 2009.

To promote the single, Kuraki made her second appearance on TV Asahi's "Music Station" on June 12 as well as appearing on other TV programs such as NTV's "Music Fighter" and NHK's "Music Japan" on June 14. She also held four in-store events at Shinjuku's "Flags" (6/10), Tressa Yokohama (6/13), LaLaport Tokyo-Bay (6/13) and Nagoya's "Asunal Kanayama", entitled "Mai Kuraki 10th Anniversary Event: Beautiful", where Kuraki gave away postcard sets to audience members.

"Beautiful" debuted on the daily Oricon charts at #1 and stayed at the top for four days, however it only managed to rank at #2 on the weekly charts due to the unexpected boost in sales of Girl Next Door's "Infinity" on the last eligible day, which resulted in their first #1 charting single. "Beautiful" is Kuraki's second Top 3 entry in a row and her first single to reach the second spot in six years, since "Make My Day". With "Beautiful", Kuraki updated her own record for being the only female artist to have all of her 32 singles enter the Top 10.

Commercial performance
"Beautiful" became the first number daily one single written by a South Korean songwriter in Japan.

Usage in media
 Kose Cosmeport "Salon Style" CM song (#1)
 NTV "Sukkiri!!" June theme song (#1)

Track listing

Charts

Oricon Sales Chart

Billboard Japan Sales Chart

References

External links
Mai Kuraki Official Website

2009 singles
Mai Kuraki songs
2009 songs
Songs written by Mai Kuraki
Song recordings produced by Daiko Nagato